Crocanthes carcharias is a moth in the family Lecithoceridae. It was described by Edward Meyrick in 1910. It is found on New Guinea.

The forewings are purple black with a large irregular-edged orange patch crossing the wing beyond the middle, suffusedly connected with the costa but separated from the dorsum by a slender streak of ground colour, containing a small transverse-oval purple-black spot (the second discal stigma) near its anterior edge in the middle. The hindwings are orange, with the base narrowly black. There is an irregular purple-black streak along the termen, forming a triangular spot at the apex, with a long triangular projection above the middle reaching the middle of the disc, and a shorter sub-triangular projection below the middle.

References

Moths described in 1910
Crocanthes